Stenoma lapidea is a moth of the family Depressariidae. It is found in French Guiana.

The wingspan is about 38 mm. The forewings are pale glossy grey, with a faint greenish-violet tinge and the costal edge white and with a black basal dot. The plical and second discal stigmata are rather small, elongate and black. The hindwings are pale grey.

References

Moths described in 1916
Taxa named by Edward Meyrick
Stenoma